Squadron Leader Sir David John Checketts,  (born 1930) was Private Secretary to the Prince of Wales 1970–1979.

He joined the Royal Air Force in 1948 and received flying training at RATG Bulawayo, Southern Rhodesia in 1948–1950.

Checketts served with 14 Squadron in Germany 1950–1954, and then was an instructor at the fighter weapons school 1954–1957. From 1958 to 1959 he was Aide-de-Camp to the Commander-in-Chief Malta. He returned to Germany 1960–1961 with 3 Squadron.

From 1961 to 1966 he was appointed Equerry to the Duke of Edinburgh. Checketts and his wife were the guardians of the young Prince Charles in Australia whilst he attended Geelong Grammar School in 1966. Checketts is said to have commented that he "went out with a boy and came back with a man". On his return in 1967 he became Equerry to the Prince of Wales, and in 1970 was promoted to be his Private Secretary and Treasurer. He retired as Private Secretary in 1979, and as Treasurer in 1979. He has been Extra Equerry since 1979. He remains the longest serving of the Prince of Wales Private Secretaries.

He was later director of Phoenix Lloyd Ltd and Neilson McCarthy Company (a public relations firm) c.1970

Checketts was appointed an MVO in 1966, and promoted to CVO in 1969, and KCVO in 1979.

References

1930 births
Living people
British public relations people
Members of the Household of the Prince of Wales
Knights Commander of the Royal Victorian Order
Royal Air Force squadron leaders